2012 TV is a near-Earth Apollo asteroid with an estimated diameter of . With a short observation arc of 1.8 days, the asteroid is listed on the Sentry Risk Table and has a 1:500,000 chance of impacting Earth on April 2, 2081.

As it will come to perihelion in mid-February 2022, it will be approaching Earth from the direction of the Sun.

See also
 List of asteroid close approaches to Earth in 2022
 List of asteroid close approaches to Earth in 2012
 2012 TC4
 2012 EG5

References

External links 
 
 
 

Minor planet object articles (unnumbered)
Potential impact events caused by near-Earth objects

20121007
20220405
20121005